This list contains persons named in ancient Greek religion and mythology of minor notability, about whom either nothing or very little is known, aside from any family connections.

A

B

C

D

E

G

H

I

L

M

N

O

P

R

S

T

U

X

Z

A group of figures
Children of Priam
Homeric
Sons of Aegyptus
Theban kings

See also
Greek mythology
Ancient Greek religion
Classical mythology
List of Greek mythological figures
List of Greek mythological creatures

References

Characters in Greek mythology
Greek mythology-related lists